Ndanda Sports Club is a professional football club based in the city of Mtwara, Tanzania. They compete in the Championship, the second tier of league football in Tanzania.

History
Ndanda S.C. was founded in the Ndanda Masasi District in Mtwara region in 2011 but is currently based in Mtwara town district in Mtwara region south of Tanzania country. They played in the Premier from 2014 to 2020.

Home games are being played at the Nangwanda Sijaona Stadium in Mtwara.

Management and staff

Squad

References

External links
 

Football clubs in Tanzania
Mtwara Region